Xianyu may refer to:

 Xianyu people, a Beidi tribe in northern China during the Zhou dynasty
 Zhongshan (state), also called the Xianyu Kingdom
 Xianyukou (鲜鱼口), a street name of Hutong located at downtown of Beijing, meaning crossing of Xianyu 
 Xianyu, Dingxing County (贤寓镇), a town in Dingxing County, Hebei, China
 Xianyu, Zhuzhou (仙庾镇), a town in Hetang District, Zhuzhou, Hunan, China
 Xianyu, Shitai County (仙寓镇), a town in Shitai County, Anhui, China
 Xianyu (surname) (鮮于), a Chinese compound surname listed in the Hundred Family Surnames